Gluvrekletten Peak is a peak,  high, between Terningskarvet Mountain and Nupskammen Ridge in the Gjelsvik Mountains of Queen Maud Land, Antarctica. It was photographed from the air by the Third German Antarctic Expedition (1938–39). It was mapped by Norwegian cartographers from surveys and air photos by the Norwegian–British–Swedish Antarctic Expedition (1949–52) and the Norwegian expedition (1958–59) and named Gluvrekletten.

References

Mountains of Queen Maud Land
Princess Martha Coast